Up a Tree is a 1930 American comedy film directed by Fatty Arbuckle and starring Lloyd Hamilton.

Cast
 Lloyd Hamilton
 Addie McPhail
 Dell Henderson

See also
 Fatty Arbuckle filmography

External links

1930 films
1930 comedy films
1930 short films
American black-and-white films
Educational Pictures short films
Films directed by Roscoe Arbuckle
Films with screenplays by Roscoe Arbuckle
American comedy short films
1930s American films